{{Infobox high court
|court_name = High Court of Karnataka
|native_name='
|image = Logo of Karnataka High Court.png
|imagesize = 220px
|caption = Emblem of the court
|established =
|jurisdiction    = Karnataka
|location = Principal bench (main bench)Additional benches|coordinates = 
|type = Presidential appointment on advice of the Chief Justice of India and the Governor of Karnataka.
|authority = Constitution of India
|terms = Mandatory retirement at age 62
|positions = 62
|language= Kannada, English |website = karnatakajudiciary.kar.nic.in
|chiefjudgetitle = Chief Justice
|chiefjudgename =Prasanna B. Varale
|termstart = 15 October 2022
|termend =
}}

The High Court of Karnataka (IAST: Karnātaka Ucca N'yāyālaya, commonly called the Karnataka High Court') is the High Court of the Indian state of Karnataka and thus its highest judicial authority. The court's principal bench is located in Bengaluru, the capital city of Karnataka, with additional benches in Hubballi-Dharwada and Kalaburagi. It was previously called the High Court of Mysore. In Bengaluru, the High Court functions out of a red-painted brick building known as the Attara Kacheri, located opposite the Vidhana Soudha, the seat of the Karnataka Legislature.

 Composition 
The High Court is composed of the Chief Justice of Karnataka and other judges. Judges are appointed by the President of India. As of February 2022, there are 45 judges in the High Court, out of a sanctioned maximum strength of 62. Prasanna B. Varale has been the Chief Justice since October 15, 2022.

 Powers and jurisdiction 
The High Court is the highest judicial authority within the State of Karnataka. It has superintendence over all courts and tribunals, such as district courts, operating within Karnataka, except those of the armed forces. Appeals against judgments of lower courts, such as district-level civil and sessions courts, are heard in the High Court. Appeals against judgments of the High Court are heard by the Supreme Court of India. 

The High Court is a court of record and can prosecute for contempt of itself.

The Karnataka High court has two permanent benches at Hubballi-Dharwada and Kalaburagi. The permanent Karnataka high court bench at Hubballi-Dharwada became operational on 24 August 2013 and Kalaburagi on 31 August 2013. Before operational of permanent high court benches, Hubballi-Dharwada and Kalaburagi had circuit benches of Karnataka High Court from the year 2008. Hubballi-Dharwada bench of Karnataka High Court was inaugurated by then Chief Justice of India K.G.Balakrishnan on 4 July 2008 and became operational from 7 July 2008 A.D.

 Premises 

The High Court's principal bench is located in Bengaluru, in a building called the Attara Kacheri''. It is a wide two-storied building of stone and brick, painted red, in the neoclassical style of architecture. It was constructed between 1864 and 1868. 

There was a proposal to demolish this building in the year 1982. A public interest litigation (PIL) was filed in the High Court pleading to stop the demolition. This was the first PIL to be filed in the court, and the case was heard in the same building that was supposed to be demolished. The petition was struck down by the High Court, but the proposal to demolish the building was dropped in 1985 when the Supreme Court asked the state government to reconsider demolition.

Notable judges 
Four judges of the court, E. S. Venkataramiah, M. N. Venkatachaliah, S. Rajendra Babu and H.L. Dattu, went on to become Chief Justices of India and others including Kalmanje Jagannatha Shetty, N. Venkatachala, R. V. Raveendran, Shivaraj Patil, Venkate Gopala Gowda, Mohan Shantanagoudar, S. Abdul Nazeer, A. S. Oka and B. V. Nagarathna were appointed as judges in the Supreme Court of India.

Chief Justices 
P Mahadevayya, M Sadasivayya, Nittoor Srinivasa Rau, Sam Piroj Bharucha and G. T. Nanavati were some notable Chief Justices who presided over this court.

List of former Chief Justices 
High Court of Mysore

High Court of Karnataka

Chief Justice & Judges 

The current sitting judges of the court are as follows:

Additional Benches 

The Karnataka High Court is currently functional in Bengaluru, Hubballi-Dharwada and Kalaburagi. There was a long-standing demand for an additional bench as the location of Bengaluru in south-east corner of the state caused hardship for people visiting the High Court from the distant northern regions of the state. This issue led to agitation, including boycott of court proceedings by lawyers in the northern region. The demand was finally met in the year 2006 when it was decided that circuit benches of the High Court would be set up in Hubballi-Dharwada and Kalaburagi. The new branches were inaugurated on 4 and 5 July 2008, respectively. There was later demand to make both Hubballi-Dharwada and Kalaburagi benches permanent. Consequently, Hubballi-Dharwadaa circuit bench became a permanent bench from 25 August 2013 and Kalaburagi circuit bench became a permanent bench from 31 August 2013.

Controversies 
In late 2002, 14 newspapers and periodicals reported that some judges from the High Court of Karnataka were allegedly involved in a sex scandal in Mysore. A high-level judicial inquiry committee was established by the Chief Justice. Later, the committee acquitted the judges as they could not find any substantive evidence.

References

Further reading 
 Jurisdiction and Seats of Indian High Courts
Judge strength in High Courts increased
Dharwada HC circuit bench gets permanent tag – Business Standard News

External links 
 
Official Karnataka High Court website
Luminaries who presided over the High Court

 
Buildings and structures in Bangalore
Government of Karnataka
Government buildings completed in 1868

1884 establishments in British India

British colonial architecture in India
Neoclassical architecture in India
Courts and tribunals established in 1884